Sylvan Elementary School can refer to one of several United States elementary schools:
 Sylvan Elementary School (Alamance County) in Alamance County, North Carolina
 Sylvan Elementary School (Sylvania) in Sylvania, Ohio

It can also refer to:
 Sylvan Park Elementary School in Los Angeles, California

References